Only God Can Judge Me is a mixtape by rapper Young Buck, Hosted by Freeway Ricky Ross and Bigga Rankin. The mixtape features exclusive tracks and freestyles from Young Buck with appearances by All Star Cashville Prince, 8Ball & MJG, Lupe Fiasco, Yo Gotti, and more. It was released for digital download on September 16, 2009. Due to contract issues with G-Unit Records and a feud with label head 50 Cent, Young Buck couldn't release a new album, so through his own label Cashville Records and Strong Family Entertainment he released an official mixtape for his fans.

Track list

References

External links 
 

2009 mixtape albums
Young Buck albums
Albums produced by Drumma Boy